Cowwarr is a town in Victoria, Australia, 27 kilometres north-east of Traralgon, 174 kilometres east of Melbourne, in the Shire of Wellington. At the 2016 census, Cowwarr and the surrounding area had a population of 368.

Established in the 1860s (when the usual spelling was "Cowwar"), the town serviced the area around Walhalla during the Victorian gold rush. The Post Office opened on 1 February 1869 as Upper Heyfield and was renamed Cowwarr in 1870. Cowwarr was a wayside station on the former Traralgon-Maffra-Stratford railway, which opened in 1883. Daily passenger trains from Maffra ran through to Traralgon station (connecting to Melbourne and beyond) until 1977, and the last freight train passed through the town in 1987. The former railway has been converted to the Gippsland Plains Rail trail.

Historic buildings remain in the town today. A Heritage Listed Arts & Craft butter factory, built in 1918, was converted into the Cowwarr Art Space, a gallery for contemporary art. The gallery closed in February 2020. The Cricket Club Hotel first established in 1880 as a wooden building the current concrete Art Deco building was constructed in 1930 as was the Cowwarr Public Hall opposite.  The town is supported by district farming, including dairy farming, irrigated from the Rainbow Creek, which runs past Cowwarr, and the Thomson River.

The town has an Australian Rules football team competing in the North Gippsland Football League a Netball team a primary school which burnt down in late January 2020 and a picturesque Catholic Church.

References

Towns in Victoria (Australia)
Shire of Wellington